In the theory of  evolution and natural selection, the Price equation (also known as Price's equation or Price's theorem) describes how a trait or allele changes in frequency over time. The equation uses a covariance between a trait and fitness, to give a mathematical description of evolution and natural selection. It provides a way to understand the effects that gene transmission and natural selection have on the frequency of alleles within each new generation of a population. The Price equation was derived by George R. Price, working in London to re-derive W.D. Hamilton's work on kin selection. Examples of the Price equation have been constructed for various evolutionary cases. The Price equation also has applications in economics.

It is important to note that the Price equation is not a physical or biological law. It is not a concise or general expression of experimentally validated results. It is rather a purely mathematical relationship between various statistical descriptors of population dynamics. It is mathematically valid, and therefore not subject to experimental verification. In simple terms, it is a mathematical restatement of the expression "survival of the fittest" which is actually self-evident, given the mathematical definitions of "survival" and "fittest".

Statement

The Price equation shows that a change in the average amount  of a trait in a population from one generation to the next is determined by the covariance between the amounts  of the trait for  subpopulation  and the fitnesses  of the subpopulations, together with the expected change in the amount of the trait value due to fitness, namely : 

If the covariance between fitness and trait value is positive, the trait value is expected to rise on average across population . If the covariance is negative, the characteristic is harmful, and its frequency is expected to drop.

The second term, represents the portion of  due to all factors other than direct selection which can affect trait evolution. This term can encompass genetic drift, mutation bias, or meiotic drive. Additionally, this term can encompass the effects of multi-level selection or group selection. Price (1972) referred to this as the "environment change" term, and denoted both terms using partial derivative notation (∂NS and ∂EC). This concept of environment includes interspecies and ecological effects. Price describes this as follows:

Proof
Likewise  and  will be called the child population numbers and characteristics, and  will be called the fitness associated with index i. Define the parent and child population totals:
{|cellspacing=20
|-
|  || 
|}
and the probabilities (or frequencies):
{|cellspacing=20
|-
|  || 
|}
Note that these are of the form of probability mass functions in that  and are in fact the probabilities that a random individual drawn from the parent or child population has a characteristic . Define the fitnesses:

The average of any list  is given by: 

so the average characteristics are defined as:
{|cellspacing=20
|-
| || 
|}
and the average fitness is:

A simple theorem can be proved:

so that:

and

The sum of the two terms is:

Using the above mentioned simple theorem, the sum becomes 

where
.

Derivation of the continuous-time Price equation 
The number  of individuals belonging to group  experiences exponential growth:where  corresponds to the fitness of the group. We want to derive an equation describing the time-evolution of the expected value of the trait:Based on the chain rule, we may derive an ordinary differential equation:A further application of the chain rule for  gives us:Summing up the components gives us that:

which is also known as the replicator equation. Now, note that:
Therefore, putting all of these components together, we arrive at the continuous-time Price equation:

Simple Price equation
When the characteristic values  do not change from the parent to the child generation, the second term in the Price equation becomes zero resulting in a simplified version of the Price equation:

which can be restated as:

where  is the fractional fitness: .

This simple Price equation can be proven using the definition in Equation (2) above. It makes this fundamental  statement about evolution: "If a certain inheritable characteristic is correlated with an increase in fractional fitness, the average value of that characteristic in the child population will be increased over that in the parent population."

Applications

The Price equation can describe any system that changes over time, but is most often applied in evolutionary biology. The evolution of sight provides an example of simple directional selection. The evolution of sickle cell anemia shows how a heterozygote advantage can affect trait evolution. The Price equation can also be applied to population context dependent traits such as the evolution of sex ratios. Additionally, the Price equation is flexible enough to model second order traits such as the evolution of mutability. The Price equation also provides an extension to Founder effect which shows change in population traits in different settlements

Dynamical sufficiency and the simple Price equation

Sometimes the genetic model being used encodes enough information into the parameters used by the Price equation to allow the calculation of the parameters for all subsequent generations. This property is referred to as dynamical sufficiency. For simplicity, the following looks at dynamical sufficiency for the simple Price equation, but is also valid for the full Price equation.

Referring to the definition in Equation (2), the simple Price equation for the character  can be written:

For the second generation:

The variables  and  can both be thought of as characteristics of the first generation, so the Price equation can be used to calculate them as well:

Dynamical sufficiency means that such equations can be found in the genetic model, allowing the Price equation to be used alone as a propagator of the dynamics of the model forward in time.

Full Price equation
The simple Price equation was based on the assumption that the characters  do not change over one generation. If it is assumed that they do change, with  being the value of the character in the child population, then the full Price equation must be used. A change in character can come about in a number of ways. The following two examples illustrate two such possibilities, each of which introduces new insight into the Price equation.

Genotype fitness 

We focus on the idea of the fitness of the genotype. The index  indicates the genotype and the number of type  genotypes in the child population is:

which gives fitness:

Since the individual mutability  does not change, the average mutabilities will be:

with these definitions, the simple Price equation now applies.

Lineage fitness 

In this case we want to look at the idea that fitness is measured by the number of children an organism has, regardless of their genotype. Note that we now have two methods of grouping, by lineage, and by genotype. It is this complication that will introduce the need for the full Price equation. The number of children an -type organism has is:

which gives fitness:

We now have characters in the child population which are the average character of the -th parent.

with global characters:

with these definitions, the full Price equation now applies.

Criticism
The use of the change in average characteristic per generation as a measure of evolutionary progress is not always appropriate. There may be cases where the average remains unchanged (and the covariance between fitness and characteristic is zero) while evolution is nevertheless in progress. However, the average characteristics are z=2 and z'=2 so that . The covariance  is also zero. The simple Price equation is required here, and it yields 0=0. In other words, it yields no information regarding the progress of evolution in this system.

A critical discussion of the use of the Price equation can be found in van Veelen (2005), van Veelen et al. (2012), and van Veelen (2020). Frank (2012) discusses the criticism in van Veelen et al. (2012).

Cultural references
Price's equation features in the plot and title of the 2008 thriller film WΔZ.

The Price equation also features in posters in the computer game BioShock 2, in which a consumer of a "Brain Boost" tonic is seen deriving the Price equation while simultaneously reading a book. The game is set in the 1950s, substantially before Price's work.

See also
 Price equation examples

References

Further reading

 
 
 
 
 
 
 
 
 
 

 

Equations
Evolutionary dynamics
Evolutionary biology
Population genetics